Leigh Miller (born August 17, 1905 in Elmsdale, Nova Scotia, died May 24, 1998 in Halifax, Nova Scotia) was a Canadian athlete who competed in the 1930 British Empire Games.

At the 1930 Empire Games he won the gold medal with the Canadian relay team in the 4×110 yards event. In the 100 yards competition he was eliminated in the heats.

Competition record

External links
Profile at trackfield.brinkster.net

1905 births
1998 deaths
People from Hants County, Nova Scotia
Sportspeople from Nova Scotia
Canadian male sprinters
Athletes (track and field) at the 1930 British Empire Games
Commonwealth Games gold medallists for Canada
Commonwealth Games medallists in athletics
Medallists at the 1930 British Empire Games